Athrips carthaginella is a moth of the family Gelechiidae. It is found in Tunisia.

The wingspan is about 9 mm. The forewings are dark grey, irregularly mottled by very small spots and points. There is a black fascia in the middle, interrupted basally. The hindwings are grey. Adults are on wing in October.

References

Moths described in 1940
Athrips
Moths of Africa